is a Japanese 2004 teen comedy film directed and co-written by Shinobu Yaguchi. The plot follows a group of inept high school girls who form a big band. The cast includes Juri Ueno, Yuta Hiraoka, Shihori Kanjiya, Yuika Motokariya and Yukari Toyashima. The film ranked 8th at the Japanese box office in 2004, and won seven prizes at 28th Japan Academy Prize, including "Most Popular Film" and "Newcomer of the Year" for Yuta Hiraoka and Juri Ueno.

Plot 
A class of schoolgirls are bored during their summer make-up class. When the school brass band leaves to perform at a baseball game without their bento lunches, Tomoko and the other girls persuade their math teacher, Mr. Ozawa, to let them deliver the lunches. On the train, the girls fall asleep after eating one of the lunches and miss their stop. They walk back to deliver the lunches to the band, but they have spoiled in the summer heat, and all but their cymbal player, Takuo Nakamura, who missed out on his meal, becomes sick.

Takuo holds an audition for band replacements to play at an upcoming baseball game. Only three girls audition: two former members of a punk band, and the shy Kaori Sekiguchi. Takuo confronts the other girls, threatening to turn them in for the food poisoning in if they do not join. The girls have no musical experience and clown around with their instruments, except for Kaori. As they are several members short of a brass band, Takuo decides to turn the group into a big band and perform swing jazz.

The girls train hard for the performance. Kaori's talent inspires the others, and they come to enjoy playing. However, on the day before the game, just as the girls have become confident, the brass band members recover and the girls are devastated.

As the new school year begins, Tomoko buys a saxophone and discovers Takuo playing his keyboard. The members of the swing band gather at school and decide to buy their own instruments. The girls get supermarket jobs to earn money, but Tomoko and several others lose their wages when a cooking demonstration gets out of hand, triggering the store's fire sprinkler system. The remaining girls spend a day picking matsutake mushrooms, but are attacked by a boar; they kill it and claim reward money, as the boar had been destroying crops. With the money, the girls buy cheap damaged instruments, and the two rockers convince their ex-boyfriends, who operate a wrecking yard, to repair them.

The group, now dubbed Swing Girls, play their first public show; the performance goes badly, but Kaori is given advice by an anonymous jazz fan. When the group approach him, he runs away. They chase him to his home and discover that he is Mr. Ozawa, who possesses an extensive collection of jazz records. Assuming he is an expert saxophonist player, they convince him to lead the band.

The band's skills improve and they record an audition tape for a music festival. They leave Tomoko in charge of the tape, but she sends it too late and the band is rejected. Tomoko is too embarrassed to tell the others. Nakamura discovers that Mr. Ozawa is not really a professional saxophonist, and he quits, embarrassed.

On the train to the music festival, Tomoko confesses that the band have no place at the festival, and the train is halted by snow.  However, their teacher Ms. Itami informs them that another band has cancelled due to the snow and rushes them to the festival by bus. The Swing Girls rush onstage just in time and perform their set, impressing the crowd.

Cast

The Swing Girls and a boy Orchestra 
It consists of 16 female students and 1 male student in the first year of Yamakawa High School, a total of 17 students. The band's official name is Swing Girls and a Boy and is also known as Swing Girls for short.
 Juri Ueno as Tomoko Suzuki (Tenor saxophone)
 Yuta Hiraoka as Takuo Nakamura (Piano)
 Shihori Kanjiya as Yoshie Saito (Trumpet)
 Yuika Motokariya as Kaori Sekiguchi (Trombone)
 Yukari Toyoshima as Naomi Tanaka (Drums)
 Kana Sekine as Hiromi Watanabe (Electric guitar)
 Fumiko Mizuta as Yuka Yamamoto (Electric bass)
 Masae Nemoto as Akemi Otsu (Tenor saxophone)
 Asuka (Asuka Yamaguchi) as Chika Kubo (Alto saxophone)
 Chise Nakamura as Emiko Okamura (Alto saxophone)
 Madoka Matsuda as Yumiko Shimizu (Baritone saxophone)
 Mutsumi Kanazaki as Rie Ishikawa (Trumpet)
 Nagisa Abe as Reiko Shimoda (Trumpet)
 Misa Nagashima as Misato Miyazaki (Trumpet)
 Eri Maehara as Kayo Yoshida (Trombone)
 Natsuki Nakaza as Miho Kinoshita (Trombone)
 Natsuko Tatsumi as Yoko Kobayashi (Trombone)

Tomoko Suzuki's Family 
 Yasumi Suzuki, Father of Tomoko: Fumiyo Kohinata
 Sanae Suzuki, Mother of Tomoko: Eriko Watanabe
 Aki Suzuki, Tomoko's sister: Rina Kanako
 Tomoko's grandmother, Mie Suzuki: Mutsuko Sakura

Yamakawa High School 

 Tadahiko Ozawa, Math Teacher: Naoto Takenaka
 Music Teacher Yayoi Itami: Miho Shiraishi
 Dr. Kubota: Makoto Takarai
 General Manager of Brass Band Club: Issei Takahashi 
 Baseball Club Member Inoue: Seiji Fukushi
 Chie Iwasa: Mayuko Iwasa

Other 

 Bus driver: Jiro Sato
 Bento shop: Noyuki Mori shimo
 Cherry Television Announcer: Yuko Takeda ( Fuji TV Announcer )
 Mr. Sasaki, a classmate of the telephone network: Nakazawa Tsuki (voice appearance)
 Old Woman: Yasuko Mori
 Musical instrument shop clerk: Norika Eguchi
 Supermarket Manager Takahashi: Hana Kino
 Super Floor Chief Okamura: Koji Okura
 Supermarket customers demanding discount stickers: Sayuri Ito
 Takashi, brother of brother duo: Hidekazu Mashima
 Yusuke Mikami, brother of brother duo: Makoto Mikami
 Wife in front of the park: Mari Hayashida
 Karaoke Box Clerk Ito: Yu Tokui
 Pachinko parlor manager: Tanaka Keiko
 Pachinko parlor guest: Satoshi Sakata
 Pachinko parlor guest: Reo Yamaguchi
 Yamaha Music Class Teacher Mori shimo (trombone): Kei Tani
 Yamaha Music Class Student Masumi (Wood Bass): Naomi Nishida
 Satoshi Tanimoto, Student of Yamaha Music Class ( Electronic Piano ): Kazuhiro Tanimoto
 Train Conductor: Yuji Kogata
 Train passengers: Hiroshi Kishimoto
 Music Hall Moderator: Daikichi Sugawara (Note: In the DVD-version with English subtitles the credits adds the names of actors randomly i.e. the sequence of persons shown does not match the name below.)

Staff 

 Writer/Director: Shinobu Yaguchi
 Producers: Chihiro Kameyama, Nonari Shimatani, Ryuichi Mori
 Executive Producer: Shoji Masui
 Projects: Kazuyuki Seki, Masamichi Fujiwara, Takehiko Chino
 Producers: Daisuke Sekiguchi, Shintaro Horikawa
 Advertising Producer: Erika Harada
 Script cooperation: Junko Yaguchi (Wife of Director Yaguchi)
 Music: Mickey Yoshino, Hiroshi Kishimoto
 Recording Engineer: Masumi Hamamoto
 Band Direction: Reo Yamaguchi
 Photo: Takahide Shibaso
 Lighting: Tatsuya Nagata
 Sound: Kodo Gun
 Art: Norihiro Isoda
 Editing: Miyajima Ryuji
 Supporting Director: Shozo Katashima
 Line Producer: Tatsuya Mmoshi
 Producer: Yuko Maemura
 Assistant Director: Yuichi Naruse, Man Sugita, Kako Araki
 Animal Trainer: Kazuo Numata
 Language instruction: Hidekazu Mashima, Sayuri Ito (mainly in Mashima's absence)
 Production: Fuji TV, Altamila Pictures, Toho, Dentsu

Music 
 "Take the A Train" by Billy Strayhorn (rehearsal song).
 "In the Mood" by Joe Garland (song for the first performance and later for audition tape).
 "Comin Thro' the Rye" (the first song played at the second performance).
 "Make Her Mine" by Eric Leese (the second song).
 "Moonlight Serenade" by Mitchel Parish / Glenn Miller (the first song played at the concert finale).
 "Mexican Flyer" by Ken Woodman (the second song). It is featured in Space Channel 5, which Tomoko's little sister plays early on in the movie.
 "Sing, Sing, Sing (With a Swing)" by Loise Prima performed by Benny Goodman (the third song).
"What a wonderful world"  by  Robert Thiele (aka "George Douglas") and George David Weiss (shown as movie credits). Performed by Louis Armstrong (The song in mushroom picking forest).
"Recollection" by Kohsuke Mine.
"L-O-V-E" by Bert Kaempfert / Milt Gabler performed by Nat King Cole (the general film tune at the end).

Release 
Swing Girls was released in Japan on September 11, 2004 where it was distributed by Toho.

Awards 
 28th Japan Academy Awards  (The largest number of award-winning films in the same year)
 Outstanding Work Award
 Best Director: Fumi yasushi Yaguchi
 Best Screenplay: Fumi yasushi Yaguchi
 Best Music: Mickey Yoshino / Hiroshi Kishimoto
 Best Recording: Hiromido Gun
 Best Editor: Ryuji Miyajima
 Best New Actor (rookie): Juri Ueno, Yuta Hiraoka
 Topic Award: Work Category
 The 26th Yokohama Film Festival
 The 10 Best Japanese Movies: 4th 
 Japan Film Individual Award
 Best Screenplay: Fumi yasushi Yaguchi
 Photography Award: Takahide Shibaso ("Swing Girls", "Need to Take a Deep Breath", "Yingyance")
 Best Newcomer: Juri Ueno (Swing Girls, Jose, The Tiger and the Fish, Chillsok Summer)
 The 14th Japan Film Critics Awards: Award for Best Film
 The 78th Kinema Shunpo Best Japanese Movie Ten: No.7 
 The 47th Blue Ribbon Award: Best Japanese Film
 The 46th Japan Record Awards  Planning Award: SWING GIRLS & Mickey Yoshino et al. ("SWING GIRLS" ORIGINAL SOUNDTRACK/ Universal Music Co., Ltd.) 
 The 19th Japan Gold Disc Awards  Soundtrack Album of the Year: SWING GIRLS/Mickey Yoshino (Swing Girls Original Soundtrack/Universal Music)
 The 2nd Japan Film and Television Recording Association Recording Award: Encouragement Award 
 29th E'Randall Awards  Producer Encouragement Award: Shoji Masui 
 The 59th Mainichi Film Competition  Sponici Grand Prix Rookie of the Year: Juri Ueno ("Chillsok No Natsu", "Swing Girls") 
 The 14th Tokyo Sports Film Awards  NewComer Award (Nominated): Juri Ueno

Footnotes 
 References

Bibliography

External links 
  
  
 Swing Girls at JFDB
 

2004 films
2000s musical comedy-drama films
Films directed by Shinobu Yaguchi
Films set in Yamagata Prefecture
Japanese musical films
Japanese high school films
2000s Japanese-language films
Jazz films
Japanese comedy-drama films
Toho films
2004 comedy films
2004 drama films
2000s Japanese films